Emory G. Bauer Field is a baseball venue in Valparaiso, Indiana, United States.  It is home to the Valparaiso Beacons baseball team of the NCAA Division I Missouri Valley Conference.  Opened in 1970, it has a capacity of 500 spectators.

Naming 
The facility is named for former Valparaiso baseball coach Emory G. Bauer.  In 28 season as head baseball coach, Bauer compiled a record of 361-245-2 (.595).  He coached the Crusaders to 11 NCAA tournament appearances.  Between 1946 and 1981, Bauer also served as Valparaiso's football coach, basketball coach, golf coach, physical education department chair, and athletic director.

Renovations 
Renovations beginning in 2001 made several improvement to the facility.  A clubhouse, locker rooms, and indoor training facility were added adjacent to a new home dugout.  In 2008, a new sound system and outfield fence were added, and the press box was renovated. In 2018, a weight room was added to the clubhouse facility, and prior to the 2021 season, synthetic turf was installed for the infield and foul lines.

See also 
 List of NCAA Division I baseball venues

References 

College baseball venues in the United States
Baseball venues in Indiana
Valparaiso Beacons baseball
Buildings and structures in Valparaiso, Indiana